The J. B. Evans House (now known as the Sandoway Discovery Center and formerly known as the Sandoway House Nature Center) is a historic house located at 142 South Ocean Boulevard in Delray Beach, Florida, United States. It retains its essential historic architectural integrity, and is a landmark in Delray Beach.

Description and history 
The house has a two-story, wood-frame structure, and was originally constructed as a single-family residence. Built in 1936, during the Depression as a seasonal residence, the construction represents what locally is known as Resort Colonial Style. It has an irregular floor plan and was built on a concrete slab foundation. The first story has horizontal clapboard, and the second story is board and batten. The house has a composition-shingled complex hip roof that is low-pitched and has a brick chimney in the center. The windows are filled with 6/6 double-hung wooden sashes which are protected by operable louvered shutters.

It was added to the U.S. National Register of Historic Places on March 28, 2002.

Sandoway Discovery Center
The Sandoway Discovery Center is a coastal ecosystems and marine life center. It features native plants, live native and invasive reptile species, a coral reef pool with sharks and fish, and a large collection of shells from around the world. The center offers environmental education programs and classes.

References

External links

 Sandoway Discovery Center
 Sandoway House Nature Center at Florida's Office of Cultural and Historical Programs

Colonial Revival architecture in Florida
Delray Beach, Florida
Houses completed in 1936
Houses in Palm Beach County, Florida
Houses on the National Register of Historic Places in Florida
National Register of Historic Places in Palm Beach County, Florida
Nature centers in Florida
Shell museums
Tourist attractions in Palm Beach County, Florida